Marov is a Slavic masculine surname, its feminine counterpart is Marova or Márová. Notable people with the surname include:

Libuše Márová (born 1943), Czech operatic mezzo-soprano
Netsai Marova, Zimbabwean activist
Nikola Márová, Czech ballerina
Valery Marov (born 1993), Belarusian football player